Volition is an American video game developer located in Champaign, Illinois. It was founded in 1993 by programmers Mike Kulas and Matt Toschlog as Parallax Software. The company grew to eight employees while developing its first game, the first-person spaceship shooter Descent (1995), which was released to widespread acclaim. After the release of Descent II (1996), the two founders split the company, with Toshlog moving to Michigan with some of the employees and founding Outrage Entertainment, while Kulas remained in Illinois and renamed the company to Volition. Outrage went on to develop Descent 3, while Volition moved on to develop the space combat game Descent: FreeSpace – The Great War (1998), growing to around 20 employees during its development. After it successfully launched, Volition began four separate projects while expanding to around 40 employees; the first, FreeSpace 2, was critically acclaimed but had lower sales than its predecessor; two other games—Descent 4 and Tube Racer—were cancelled; and Summoner (2000), was released as a PlayStation 2 launch title. Volition's previous games had been published by Interplay Entertainment, but the contract had expired and Interplay was not interested in publishing a role-playing video game from Volition; instead, THQ not only agreed to publish Summoner but bought Volition entirely during its development in 2000. It purchased Outrage Entertainment as well in 2002, which remained a separate studio until its closure the following year.

Descent 4 had been cancelled due to Interplay abandoning the project; as Interplay owned the rights to the franchise, Volition reused the assets to make the first person shooter Red Faction (2001). It was followed by Red Faction II (2002) and Summoner 2 (2002). The third games in both of these series were cancelled after sales were lower than expected. At THQ's suggestion, Volition made a tie-in game, The Punisher, for the 2004 film of the same name, which sold well. Volition brainstormed ideas for a new project, and decided to make an open world action-adventure "gang simulator", Saints Row (2006), as the Grand Theft Auto franchise was the only major series in the genre. THQ was hesitant about the idea, but Volition convinced them that the humorous tone of the game would offset the subject matter. Volition expanded to over 100 employees working on the game during development. The game sold very well, and the company moved on to make Saints Row 2 (2008) as well as resuming the Red Faction series with Red Faction: Guerrilla (2009). Both series were followed by another installment in 2011, Saints Row: The Third and Red Faction: Armageddon, and a horror game project, Insane, was announced in 2010 as the first in a trilogy. Kulas left the company in 2011, later founding Revival Productions with Toschlog in 2014.

In August 2012, THQ cancelled Insane, and in December it filed for bankruptcy. Volition was acquired by Koch Media for US$22 million, and merged with publisher Deep Silver to form Deep Silver Volition, while several franchises, including Summoner and Red Faction, were sold to Nordic Games, which later bought Koch Media in 2018. In late 2022, Nordic's parent company Embracer Group split Volition away from Deep Silver to be a part of an operating group under Gearbox Entertainment, though still an independent studio. Since leaving THQ in 2012 Volition has grown to over 200 employees and has focused on the Saints Row franchise, producing Saints Row IV (2013), its stand-alone expansion Saints Row: Gat out of Hell (2015), and the franchise reboot Saints Row (2022). It has additionally developed Agents of Mayhem (2017), a superhero-themed action-adventure game connected to the Saints Row franchise. In nearly 30 years of operation, Volition has developed 18 titles, as well as at least 6 titles that were cancelled while in development.

Games

As Parallax Software

As Volition

Canceled

References

External links 
 

Volition